Yasin Ben El-Mhanni (born 26 October 1995) is a professional footballer who plays for Scottish Championship side Arbroath as a winger.

Before joining Newcastle United in 2016, he played in non-League football with Farnborough and Lewes.

Club career

Early career
El-Mhanni was born in Shepherd's Bush, London. He was soon signed by Barnet before playing with Aldershot Town, as well as Isthmian League clubs Farnborough and Lewes. While playing in the southern leagues, Ben El-Mhanni made a name for himself on YouTube where videos of his skill and trickery earned him the chance to star in commercials for Sports on Screen. For the commercials, Ben El-Mhanni flew to Spain and acted as a body double and skill consultant for Brazil and Barcelona star Neymar, as well as multiple Ballon d'Or winner Cristiano Ronaldo. His display of skill in the lower English leagues saw him dubbed the "non-League Riyad Mahrez" because of his North African heritage and similar style-of-play.

In 2015 and 2016, Ben El-Mhanni trialed with several Premier League clubs, including Watford, Bournemouth, West Bromwich Albion, Crystal Palace and Chelsea. During his spell with Chelsea, Ben El-Mhanni trained under first-team manager, Guus Hiddink and scored on his debut for the reserve side.

Newcastle United
On 8 July 2016, Ben El-Mhanni was signed by then Championship club Newcastle United. His debut came on 18 January 2017 in the third round of the FA Cup, in which he played 70 minutes in a 3–1 win over Championship rivals Birmingham City. Ben El-Mhanni featured again in the next round, but could not help prevent Newcastle from being eliminated at the hands of League One club Oxford United.

In January 2018, Ben El-Mhanni filed a grievance against Newcastle academy coach Peter Beardsley, accusing him of bullying and discrimination. Beardsley was placed on gardening leave and at the end of the season an independent appeal body found that he had used discriminatory language and conducted himself in a generally unfair manner towards El-Mhanni. In March, between the appeal process but unrelated thereto, El-Mhanni was advised that his contract with Newcastle would not be renewed.

After his release from Newcastle United he trained with West London club Brentford during pre season.

Scunthorpe United
On 26 October 2018, Ben El-Mhanni signed for EFL League One club Scunthorpe United on a contract until the end of the season. On 13 November, he made a goalscoring debut for the club when he netted and made an assist in a 3–2 EFL Trophy loss to Mansfield Town.

His contract was extended by Scunthorpe at the end of the 2018–19 season.

Ben El-Mhanni left League Two club Scunthorpe United in the summer of 2020 after only eight appearances.

In September 2021, El Mhanni joined Southern League Premier Division South club Chesham United. In February 2022, he joined Harrow Borough. During the summer he left Harrow Borough and in July 2022, joined Championship side Reading on trial.

Arbroath 
On 2 January 2023, after having waited since the summer to sign, Ben El-Mhanni joined Scottish Championship side Arbroath until the end of the season. He made his debut the same day in a win over league leaders Dundee.

Career statistics

References

External links

1995 births
Living people
People from Shepherd's Bush
Footballers from the London Borough of Hammersmith and Fulham
English footballers
Association football midfielders
Aldershot Town F.C. players
Farnborough F.C. players
Lewes F.C. players
Newcastle United F.C. players
Scunthorpe United F.C. players
Isthmian League players
English Football League players
English people of Moroccan descent
A.F.C. Hayes players
Southern Football League players
Chesham United F.C. players
Harrow Borough F.C. players
Scottish Professional Football League players
Arbroath F.C. players